Correa may refer to:
 Correa (surname)
 Correa (insect), a genus of beetles in the family Staphylinidae
 Correa (plant), a genus of Australian plants named after Portuguese botanist José Correia da Serra
 Difuntos Correa, a Chilean rock band

See also 
 Correia, the Portuguese form of the word
 Corea (disambiguation), an alternate spelling and homonym